Borj Sukhteh-ye Sofla (also Romanized as Borj Sūkhteh-ye Soflá; also known as Boneh Seyyed Naşrollāh and Boneh-ye Seyyed Naşrollāh) is a village in Anarestan Rural District, Chenar Shahijan District, Kazerun County, Fars Province, Iran. At the 2006 census, its population was 115, in 22 families.

References 

Populated places in Chenar Shahijan County